Luka Stančić (1939 – 2 January 1990) was a Serbian professional basketball coach and player who spent entire playing career and the most of his coaching career with his hometown team Metalac. He's known for his coaching accomplishment with Yugoslavia Juniors & Cadets during the late 1970s.

Coaching career 
Stančić had three stints with his hometown team Metalac. Also, he coached Vojvodina and Sarajevo-based powerhouse Bosna. He spent a year coaching in Kuwait in the late 1980s.

Yugoslavia national teams 
Stančić coached Yugoslavia cadet national team at two European Championships for Cadets. He won the gold medal at the 1979 Championship in Damascus, Syria and the silver medal at the 1977 Championship in Le Touquet and Berck, France.

Stančić coached Yugoslavia junior national team at three European Championships for Juniors. He won the gold medal at the 1976 Championship in Santiago de Compostela, Spain, the silver medal at the 1980 Championship in Yugoslav city Celje, and the bronze medal at the 1978 Italy in Roseto degli Abruzzi and Teramo, Italy. FIBA Hall of Fame coach Dušan Ivković was his assistant in 1976.

Stančić was an assistant coach of the Yugoslavia national team that won the bronze medal at the 1982 FIBA World Championship. Ranko Žeravica was a head coach of the Yugoslavia.

Legacy 
The Luka Stančić Memorial Tournament is a boy's youth age international basketball tournament organized to honor Stančić. It was inaugurated in 2012.

References

1939 births
1990 deaths
KK Bosna Royal coaches
KK Metalac coaches
KK Metalac Valjevo players
KK Vojvodina coaches
Serbian expatriate basketball people in Bosnia and Herzegovina
Serbian expatriate basketball people in Kuwait
Serbian men's basketball players
Serbian men's basketball coaches
Sportspeople from Valjevo
Yugoslav men's basketball players
Yugoslav basketball coaches